Marcel Sylvia Winkler (born 29 October 1970) is a retired South African female sprinter who specialised in 100 metres and 200 metres. She won silver medals in both events at the 1992 African Championships in Mauritius, both times finishing behind compatriot Elinda Vorster. She also competed for South Africa in the 1992 Summer Olympics in Barcelona in 100 metres, without progressing to the final.

International competitions

References

External links

1970 births
Living people
Sportspeople from Johannesburg
South African female sprinters
Olympic athletes of South Africa
Athletes (track and field) at the 1992 Summer Olympics
Olympic female sprinters
20th-century South African women
21st-century South African women